The fourth season of the singing contest Objetivo Fama began on February 3, 2007, with a pre-show in Los Angeles, California where they announced the final 20 contestants out of 30 semi-finalists. The season officially started on February 10. The judges were Roberto Sueiro, Hilda Ramos, and Fernando Allende. The show was hosted again by Mexican singer Yuri.

Auditions
Auditions were held in 23 cities among the United States and Puerto Rico in the summer and early fall of 2006.

Final cutdown
Out of each audition, a group of semi-finalists were selected. This year, the producers held a preliminary show in Los Angeles, California where they announced the official 20 contestants of the show.

The selected contestant was given a chance to perform (usually the song with which they auditioned) and then the judges will give them an overview of what they will expect of him during the show.

The ten contestants that were left out were:

The 20 selected contestants were:

* Age was taken at the beginning of the contest (2007)

Weekly Shows

Quarter-finals

First Show: February 10
The songs performed during the first show were:

The two threatened competitors of the night were: Marissa Mesa and Marleen Salinas.

Second Show: February 17
The second show opened with a group performance headed by Mexican singer, Belinda. She performed her hit song "Ni Freud ni tu mamá" together with the contestants.

The songs performed during the second show were:

Marleen Salinas was selected by the audience to leave the competition, while Marissa Mesa got another chance to stay in the show.

The judges announced four contestants whose performances weren't good enough. This were: Jorge Ochoa, Héctor Arreguin, Julissa Morel, and Aidsa Rodríguez. However, Ochoa wasn't officially threatened in the end. Héctor was finally saved by the professors, while Julissa and Aidsa remained the two sole competitors threatened to leave the show.

Third Show: February 24
The songs performed during the third show were:

Julissa Morel was selected by the audience to leave the competition, while Aidsa Rodríguez got another chance to stay in the show.

At the end of the show, the judges surprised the public when they asked five contestants: Nat Vázquez, Frances Marrero, Natalia Herrera, Juan Vélez, and José Vargas to step out front. However, they just wanted to congratulate them for their excellent performances.

They finally announced the four contestants whose performances weren't good enough. This were: Ramón García, Nathalie Rodríguez, Lizmarie Goldilla, and Marissa Mesa. However, Ramón was just warned by the judges, while Nathalie was saved by the professors. Lizmarie and Marissa where the two competitors threatened to leave the show.

The show was closed with a performance from guest group La Quinta Estación.

Fourth Show: March 3
The fourth show opened with all the contestants performing Chayanne's hit song "Este ritmo se baila así".

The songs performed during the fourth show were:

Lizmarie Goldilla was selected by the audience to leave the competition, while Marissa Mesa got another chance to stay in the show. Lizmarie was heavily criticized for his lack of discipline for not rehearsing her song with Marissa. According to the judges, this showed in her performance.

The judges called upon Aidsa Rodríguez, Ramón García and Héctor Arreguin to start improving their performances. They made clear that they did good and have the talent but have not excelled yet.

They finally announced the three threatened contestants that were: Jorge Ochoa, Arturo Guerrero, and - for the third time - Marissa Mesa. Arturo was subsequently saved by the professors. This was the last show where the professors saved any of the contestants.

Fifth Show: March 10
The fifth show opened with all the contestants performing the hit song "Cha Cha" together with Puerto Rican singer/dancer, Chelo.

This show also featured Dominican Charytín as guest host, due to the passing of Yuri's father during the week.

The songs performed during the fifth show were:

Marissa Mesa was finally selected by the audience to leave the competition after two previous nominations, while Jorge Ochoa got another chance to stay in the show. However, he was "threatened" again to leave the competition.

Héctor Arreguin was harshly criticized by all the judges for forgetting the lyrics to his song. As a result, he was unanimously threatened to leave the competition, along with Aidsa Rodríguez and Jorge.

Univision Radio host, Carlos Alvarez, was the guest judge of the night.

Sixth Show: March 17
The sixth show opened with all the contestants dancing together with Puerto Rican reggaeton singer, Tito El Bambino.

The songs performed during the sixth show were:

Jorge Ochoa and Héctor Arreguin were selected by the audience to leave the competition, while Aidsa Rodríguez got another chance to stay in the show. However, she was threatened again at the end of the show together with Arturo Guerrero and Edgar Pérez.

This show sparked some controversy because Edgar alleged that he was being judged by being overweight rather than his performance on stage. He went as far as to claim that the judges were manipulated by the production calling them "puppets". All of the judges argued that their comments about his weight were with good intentions, but what was unforgivable was his lack of discipline during the week refusing to comply with his exercise routines (something that all the contestants must do) and the fact that he is not performing up to his potential.

During the following week, both Edgar and the judges were interviewed by many local media and newspapers about the controversy.

Seventh Show: March 24
The seventh show opened with all the contestants performing David Bisbal's hit song "Lloraré Las Penas".

The songs performed during the seventh show were:

Aidsa Rodríguez and Edgar Pérez were selected by the audience to leave the competition while Arturo Guerrero got another chance to stay in the competition. The threatened competitors were Ramón García, Nathalie Rodriguez and Luz Maria Aguilar.

The show also featured a guest performance from Mexican singer, Jennifer Peña.

Eighth Show: March 31
The eight show opened with all the contestants performing their theme song "Echale Ganas".

The songs performed during the eight show were:

Luz María Aguilar and Nathalie Rodríguez were selected by the audience to leave the competition while Ramón García got another chance to stay in the competition, thus completing the group of 10 semifinalists.

The show also featured a guest performance from Mexican pop group, Reik.

Semi-finals

Ninth Show: April 7
The ninth show kickstarted the semifinals, opening with all the contestants performing the Christian song "Jesucristo" as a motif for the Holy Week.

The songs performed during the ninth show were:

In the end, Natalia Herrera was selected by the audience to leave the competition. During the semifinals, each contestant is assigned a number for which the audience will vote. Each week, the contestant with the fewest votes from all the contestants is eliminated.

The show also featured a special performance from Janina, winner of the first season of Objetivo Fama.

Univision Radio host, Raúl Brindis, was the guest judge of the night.

Tenth Show: April 14
The tenth show opened with a guest performance from Colombian singer, Fanny Lú, together with all the contestants.

The songs performed during the tenth show were:

In the end, Arturo Guerrero was selected by the audience to leave the competition.

Univision Radio host, Carlos Alvarez, was the guest judge of the night.

Eleventh Show: April 21
The eleventh show opened with a performance from Marlon, winner of the third season of Objetivo Fama. The contestants danced together with the singer.

The songs performed during the tenth show were:

In the end, Ramón García was selected by the audience to leave the competition.

The show also featured a guest performance from Puerto Rican reggaeton artist, Don Omar.

Twelfth Show: April 28
The twelfth show opened with a performance from Puerto Rican reggaeton singer, Héctor el Father dancing with the contestants.

The songs performed during the twelfth show were:

The show also featured several guest performances after the opening. Reyli Barba performed his song "Descarada" together with contestants Víctor and José. Brazilian singer Alexandre Pires also performed a song from his latest album.

Near the end of the show, all of the contestants performed Marc Anthony's song "Así Como Hoy" with special appearances from Arquímides, Mary Ann, and Patty, finalists of the past season of the show.

A very touching moment was experienced at the end since Juan Vélez and Erica Gonzaba, who became a couple during the show, were the last two contestants to remain on stage, meaning that one of them would be eliminated. In the end, Erica was selected by the audience to leave the competition.

Thirteenth Show: May 5
The thirteenth show opened with all the contestants performing "México" in honor of the Cinco de Mayo celebrations.

The songs performed during the fourteenth show were:

The show also featured guest performances from Colombian singer, Fonseca, and Mexican singer, Lupillo Rivera.

All of the contestants also performed duets from previous shows that are featured on the recently released CD of Objetivo Fama 4.

Fourteenth Show: May 12
The fourteenth show opened with all the contestants performing the song "Color Esperanza" from Diego Torres. The show was hosted by Charytín.

The songs performed during the fourteenth show were:

The show also featured a guest performance from Puerto Rican singer Yolandita Monge. Monge performed one song with contestant Frances Marrero, and another song from her upcoming new album.

The show also featured two guest judges: singer Jimena and Univision Radio host, Carlos González.

Great Finale

Fifteenth Show: May 20
The great finale featured a red carpet where various celebrities marched on. All of the contestants, but one (19 in total) were present. Héctor Arreguin wasn't able to attend because he had just signed with Regional Mexican group Los Horóscopos de Durango, and had prior commitments. The four finalists arrived on the back of convertible cars and signed autographs.

The show opened with all the last 7 contestants performing the song "Pégate" from Ricky Martin.

Each of the finalists performed two songs, one of them with one of their favorite celebrities. The songs performed during the finale were:

The show also featured the three winners from the past seasons (Janina, Anaís, and Marlon) singing "Abriendo Caminos", originally from Diego Torres and Juan Luis Guerra.

The finale closed with a guest performance from Puerto Rican reggaeton singer Daddy Yankee singing his new song "Impacto".

In the end, the finalists and winner were announced as follows:

There was a celebration outside the venue featuring R.K.M & Ken-Y.

Controversies
Some controversies that surfaced during the season.
 Puerto Rican Lizmarie Goldilla was criticized by fellow contestant Marissa Mesa for not wanting to rehearse during the week. She was threatened by the judges and the next week, the audience voted her out.
 Despite favorable reviews by judges during the course of the show, Héctor Arreguin forgot the lyrics to his song on March 10. This has been a reason for an automatic threatening. The next week, the audience voted him out.
 Contestant Edgar Alberto Pérez heavily criticized the judges decision to complain about his weight arguing that this was a singing contest, and not a beauty pageant. He was very vocal about it, while the judges replied that their critics were recommendations to him as an artist and because of his health. However, upon a threatening from the judges from a poor performance, the audience then voted him out.
 Contestants Erica Gonzaba and Juan Vélez started a relationship during the show. They even performed the song "Devuélveme la Vida" from Antonio Orozco together, and closed it with a kiss garnering much applause from the audience. However, in September 2007, they announced they had ended their relationship amicably. Gonzaba even appeared in the video for Juan's song "Buscando tu Sombra".

After the Show
 Season winner Juan Vélez released his first album titled Con Mi Soledad in December 2007. He has been nominated to a Billboard Music Awards. He presented four shows at the Luis A. Ferré Performing Arts Center, and then at the José Miguel Agrelot Coliseum.
 Second finalist Iván López released his first album titled La Voz in October 2007.
 Third finalist Víctor Santiago released his first album titled Desesperados in November 2007. After that, he has worked as TV host and actor.
 Frances Marrero and Erica Gonzaba are working on their first albums.
 Héctor Arreguin was the first contestant to sign with a musical group. He was a singer in the Mexican group Los Horóscopos de Durango, and then in Mazizo Musical.

References

External links
 Objetivo Fama Official Page

Objetivo Fama